David Eduard Steiner (7 April 1811, Winterthur – 5 April 1860 also in Winterthur) was a Swiss painter.

Biography
He began studying painting under his father and continued his studies in 1829 at the Munich Academy. He returned to Winterthur in 1837.

He first started as a portrait painter, then in 1840 he devoted himself to painting history and landscapes. His works include the tableau entitled "Ulrich Zwingli shaking hands with Martin Luther as a sign of brotherly love" (1856) for the municipal library in Winterthur.

The Zentralbibliothek Zürich also has some of his works in their collection, as does the Kunstmuseum Winterthur.

References

External links 

 
 

1811 births
1860 deaths
19th-century Swiss painters
Swiss male painters
Academy of Fine Arts, Munich alumni
19th-century Swiss male artists